Kalkaska High School is a public high school located in Kalkaska, Michigan. It is part of Kalkaska Public Schools, which, in turn, is part of the larger Traverse Bay Area Intermediate School District (TBAISD).

Demographics
The demographic breakdown of the 434 students enrolled in 2018-19 was:
Male - 51.6%
Female - 48.4%
Native American/Alaskan - 0.5%
Asian - 0.5%
Black - 0.9%
Hispanic - 2.5%
White - 94.5%
Multiracial - 1.1%

56.0% of the students were eligible for free or reduced-cost lunch.

Athletics
The Kalkaska Blazers compete in the Northern Michigan Football League and in the Lake Michigan Conference in all other sports. School colors are blue and white. The following Michigan High School Athletic Association (MHSAA) sanctioned sports are offered:

Baseball (boys)
Basketball (boys and girls)
Cross country (boys and girls)
Football (boys)
Golf (boys and girls)
Ice hockey (boys)
Soccer (boys and girls)
Softball (girls)
Track and field (boys and girls)
Volleyball (girls)
Wrestling (boys)
Powerlifting (boys and girls)
Cheerleading (boys and girls)

Notable alumni
 Ron Winter, National Football League (NFL) referee
 Renee Raudman, American voice and television actress
 Ron Ryckman Sr., former member of the Kansas House of Representatives

References

Public high schools in Michigan
Schools in Kalkaska County, Michigan